Soviet submarine K-56 may refer to one of the following submarines of the Soviet Navy:

 , a K-class submarine; completed after World War II; sunk in nuclear tests in 1957
 , an Echo II-class (or Project 675) nuclear submarine; collided with merchant ship in June 1973, killing 27 men aboard

Russian Navy ship names
Soviet Navy ship names

zh:K-56 (苏联潜艇)